Road 63 is a road in central Iran that connects Shahreza to Yasuj. From Shahreza to Semirom is Expressway.

References

External links 

 Iran road map on Young Journalists Club

63
Transportation in Isfahan Province